The Treaty of Kalmar (1397–1523) was a treaty that united the three Scandinavian kingdoms of Sweden, Denmark and Norway. It was signed on 25 September 1397 between representatives of the three kingdoms and established the Kalmar Union where all three realms were ruled by one monarch. The treaty did not unite the different legal structures of each kingdom. The agreement was broken when Gustav I of Sweden left the Kalmar Union on 6 June 1523.

See also
List of treaties

Kalmar Union
1397 in Europe
1390s in Denmark
Kalmar
Kalmar
Kalmar
Kalmar
14th century in Denmark
14th century in Sweden
14th century in Norway